Bill Anderson  (6 October 1937 - 2 August 2019) was a Scottish heavyweight sportsman. He won the World Highland Games Championships in 1981 and the Scottish Highland Games Championships 16 times. He has also held every possible Scottish record in Highland Games.

Biography

Bill was born on Greenferns Farm, Bucksburn, close to Aberdeen in Scotland. He began competing as an 18-year-old at Alford in 1956 and went on to compete at the top of his sport, excelling at caber tossing and hammer throwing.

Anderson dominated the heavy events for three decades, winning 16 Scottish championship titles as well as British, European, American, Canadian and World championships.

Anderson claimed his first Scottish title in 1959 and he became the first man to hurl the hammer  in 1969 at the Lochearnhead Games. Of the heavy events, the Scots hammer was Anderson's, wooden shafted and thrown from a standing position. The one and only time he threw the wire hammer was on national service in Aden in 1957 when with a standing throw he reached .

Even after retiring as a competitor, he remained active on the games circuit, judging at the Aberdeen, Crieff, Aboyne and Braemar Highland Games.

Anderson competed in the 1979 World's Strongest Man contest, but withdrew early in the competition due to an injury.

A biography, Highland Fling was published by Argyll Publishing.

Bill Anderson died on 12 August 2019.

Accomplishments
1981 World Highland Games Championships Champion
Four times World Caber Tossing Champion
Winner of 16 Scottish Highland Games Championships
Five times USA Highland Games Champion 1976–1980
Canadian Highland Games Champion 1977

Awards and honours
He was made a Member of the Order of the British Empire (MBE) in the 1977 New Year Honours by Queen Elizabeth II, for services to Highland Games.

Anderson was inducted into the Scottish Sports Hall of Fame in 2007.

References

External links 
"Last Words" BBC Radio 4, broadcast 6 September 2019

1937 births
2019 deaths
Members of the Order of the British Empire
Scottish highland games competitors
Scottish strength athletes
Sportspeople from Aberdeen